Chthonius minotaurus is a species of pseudoscorpion in the Chthoniidae family that is endemic to Crete.

Description
The species colour is reddish-orange.

References

Chthoniidae
Animals described in 1997
Endemic arthropods of Crete